Juan Luis Boscio Desprez (21 June 1896 – 3 September 1980) was a Puerto Rican merchant and Mayor of Ponce, Puerto Rico from 1961 to 1964. During his tenure as mayor, in 1962, a major shopping mall opened in the city called Centro del Sur which, at the moment of its opening was "the most modern in the Caribbean".

Early years
Boscio Desprez was the son of Juan Bautista Boscio-Cofresí and Eugenia Desprez Boudon. He was born on 21 June 1896 in Cabo Rojo, Puerto Rico. He married Herminia Monllor on 23 December 1922 and they had 3 children: Roberto (b. abt. 1925), Jose Luis (b. abt 1926), and Gladys (b. abt. 1928).

Philanthropist
Juan Luis Boscio was one of the founders of the Albergue de Niños de Ponce (Ponce Children's Shelter), a non-profit organization dedicated to the providing shelter for homeless children. The shelter building opened in 1947 on the north side of Calle Villa in Barrio Canas, between Calle Cementerio Civil and Calle Central. Boscio also donated $10,000 from his own capital to help pay for the project. Albergue de Niños later moved to the south side of Calle Villa, past Jaime L. Drew School, east of PR-500.

Death
Boscio Deprez died on 3 September 1980 from an "aortic insufficiency and heart failure." He was buried at Cementerio Católico San Vicente de Paul in Ponce.

Indictment of son
In the early 1980s, Juan Luis Boscio Monllor, son of Juan Luis Boscio Desprez, (aka, Juan Luis Boscio, Jr.) was president of the board of directors of the Ponce Municipal Development Authority (PMDA) during the tenure of mayor José G. Tormos Vega. His son, Boscio Monllor, was indicted on 31 October 1985, by a federal grand jury for extortion, together with mayor Tormos Vega. He was tried on 27 May 1988.

See also
 Ponce, Puerto Rico
 List of Puerto Ricans

References

Further reading
 Fay Fowlie de Flores. Ponce, Perla del Sur: Una Bibliográfica Anotada. Second Edition. 1997. Ponce, Puerto Rico: Universidad de Puerto Rico en Ponce. p. 12. Item 59. 
 Juan Diez de Andino. "Estampa Ponceña." Andanzas y perfiles. San Juan, Puerto Rico. s.n. 1969. pp. 144–147. (CUC/CUTPO/PUCPR/RUM)
 Fay Fowlie de Flores. Ponce, Perla del Sur: Una Bibliográfica Anotada. Second Edition. 1997. Ponce, Puerto Rico: Universidad de Puerto Rico en Ponce. p. 173. Item 880. 
 Carnaval de Ponce: programa. Ponce, Puerto Rico. 196x? - . Includes photos. (Archivo Histórico Municipal de Ponce, AHMP; Colegio Universitario Tecnológico de Ponce, CUTPO)
 Fay Fowlie de Flores. Ponce, Perla del Sur: Una Bibliográfica Anotada. Second Edition. 1997. Ponce, Puerto Rico: Universidad de Puerto Rico en Ponce. p. 332. Item 1657. 
 Ponce. Informe anual de actividades administrativas y fiscales sometido a la Honorable Asamblea Municipal de Ponce por el Honorable Alcalde de Ponce, año fiscal 1963-64. Ponce, Puerto Rico. 1964? - . Includes photos. (Archivo Histórico Municipal de Ponce, AHMP; Colegio Universitario Tecnológico de Ponce, CUTPO)

1896 births
1980 deaths
Burials at Cementerio Católico San Vicente de Paul
Businesspeople from Ponce
Members of the Senate of Puerto Rico
New Progressive Party (Puerto Rico) politicians
Mayors of Ponce, Puerto Rico
People from Cabo Rojo, Puerto Rico
20th-century American politicians